Anna-Lisa Eriksson (21 June 1928 – 26 May 2012) was a Swedish cross-country skier who won a bronze medal in the 3 × 5 km relay at the 1956 Winter Olympics in Cortina d'Ampezzo.

Eriksson won another bronze medal in the 3 × 5 km relay at the 1954 FIS Nordic World Ski Championships in Falun. She also won the 10 km event at the Holmenkollen ski festival in 1957.

Cross-country skiing results

Olympic Games
 1 medal – (1 bronze)

World Championships
 1 medal – (1 bronze)

References

External links
 Holmenkollen winners since 1892 - click Vinnere for downloadable pdf file 
 Swedish skiing medalists 1924-2006 
 World Championship results 
 Anna-Lisa Eriksson's profile at the Swedish Olympic Committee 

1928 births
2012 deaths
People from Sundsvall Municipality
Cross-country skiers from Västernorrland County
Swedish female cross-country skiers
Olympic cross-country skiers of Sweden
Cross-country skiers at the 1956 Winter Olympics
Olympic bronze medalists for Sweden
Holmenkollen Ski Festival winners
Olympic medalists in cross-country skiing
FIS Nordic World Ski Championships medalists in cross-country skiing
Medalists at the 1956 Winter Olympics
20th-century Swedish women